Kate Jenkins (born 1968) has been the Sex Discrimination Commissioner at the Australian Human Rights Commission since 2016. Previously, she was Commissioner at the Victorian Equal Opportunity and Human Rights Commission. Jenkins is also on the Board of Berry Street Victoria – the state's largest independent child and family welfare organisation – and a member of the boards of Heide Museum of Modern Art and Carlton Football Club.

In January 2020, Jenkins handed to the Morrison government her Respect@Work report, described by the ABC as “a landmark national inquiry into sexual harassment in workplaces by the Australian Human Rights Commission”.

In November of 2021, Jenkins lead a review of the Parliament House's workplace culture following the 2021 Australian Parliament House sexual misconduct allegations. Alongside former Liberal staffer Brittany Higgins, both called out the Australian Parliament House for various cases of misconduct.

Law career 
Before accepting the role of Equal Opportunity and Human Rights Commissioner, Jenkins was the lead equal opportunity partner at Herbert Smith Freehills'. There, she led the firm’s Melbourne Women in Business group for more than a decade and was the lead employment partner in the firm’s pro bono community program.

Victorian Equal Opportunity and Human Rights Commission 
Jenkins is the convener of the Victorian Male Champions of Change, the Chair of the Independent Review into sex discrimination and sexual harassment, including predatory behaviour in Victoria Police and the Co-Chair of Play by the Rules. She is also the Co-Chair of the Commission’s Disability Reference Group and a member of the Aboriginal Justice Forum.

She was recognised in the Australian Financial Review and Westpac 100 Women of Influence Awards for 2015 for her contribution in addressing equal opportunity and human rights issues in Victoria.

In October 2015 Jenkins was appointed to the board of Carlton Football Club, where she has promised to work towards creating a female team for the upcoming women's AFL competition.

Jenkins was a signatory to a statement by the Australian Council of Human Rights Authorities defending the independence and supporting the work of the Australian Human Rights Commission.

References

1968 births
Living people
20th-century Australian lawyers
Carlton Football Club administrators
Australian women lawyers
University of Melbourne alumni
Melbourne Law School alumni
21st-century Australian lawyers